The NAACP Image Award for Outstanding Character Voice-Over Performance– Television or Film arose as a category in 2016, and was awarded until 2021, when the award was split to honor film and television performances separately. Prior to this category, voice-over performances in animated works were typically nominated and honored in the Outstanding Youth Performance category.

Winners and nominees

Multiple nominations 
Loretta Devine received the most nominations in this category for her voice work in Doc McStuffins.

References 

NAACP Image Awards
Voice acting awards